Houston Community College System v. Wilson, 595 U.S. ___ (2022), is a United States Supreme Court case related to the First Amendment to the United States Constitution.

Background 

David Buren Wilson was elected a member of the Houston Community College System's board in 2013 who was censured for repeated incidences of what other members of the Board of Trustees deemed to be behavior that was not becoming of an elected official or beneficial to the HCC system. Wilson filed suit claiming that the censure was an offense to his First Amendment rights.

Supreme Court 

Certiorari was granted in the case on April 26, 2021. In a March 24, 2022 decision, the Supreme Court ruled that Wilson's First Amendment rights were not violated by his fellow board members' censure of him because the censure did not result in any hindrance of his ability to exercise his free speech in his capacity as an elected official and member of the public. The opinion cites the fact that the use of censure by elected bodies to address the behavior and actions of their members is a practice with a long history in the United States, and it also states that the censure itself constitutes an exercise of First Amendment rights by Wilson's colleagues on the board who voted to reprimand him.

References

External links 
 

2022 in United States case law
United States Supreme Court cases
United States Supreme Court cases of the Roberts Court
United States Free Speech Clause case law